Coastlands is a beach settlement in the Whakatāne District and Bay of Plenty Region of New Zealand's North Island. It is located north of Whakatāne, directly across the Whakatāne River.

A tsunami siren is located at Coastlands.

History and culture

Lady on the Rock

According to tradition, when the Mataatua waka first arrived at Whakatāne from Hawaiki 600 years ago, the men left the women alone in the canoe while they went to visit the shore. The canoe started to drift back out to sea. Wairaka, the daughter of captain-navigator Toroa, seized the paddle, and brought the waka back to shore. She forbade the tapu forbidding women to handle canoes, shouting "Kia Whakatane au i ahau", translating as "I will act the part of a man"; this phrase is the origin of Whakatāne's name.

Other traditions suggest it was Muriwai, Toroa's sister, who had brought the canoe to shore.

The Lady on the Rock statue, a bronze statue at the top of the Turuturu Rock at the mouth of the Whakatane River, commemorates the bravery of Wairaka. It was unveiled in 1965 as a memorial to the wife of Sir William Sullivan.

Local Māori

The area is within the rohe (tribal area) of the Ngāti Awa iwi. It is the site of a urupa, or graveyard, which is still used by Ngāti Awa.

The local hapū, Ngāi Taiwhakaea II, has a marae called Taiwhakaea and a meeting house called Taiwhakaea II.

In October 2020, the Government committed $305,099 from the Provincial Growth Fund to upgrade the marae. The upgrade was expected to create 8 jobs.

Recent history

There was an attempted robbery of a berry farm and cafe in Coastlands in February 2017. There were 60 customers and 15 staff inside at the cafe at the time, but only two people were injured.

A  farming block was opened for development in November 2018. A planning permission application was filed in December 2019 to build a beachside retirement village on the site.

Demographics
Statistics New Zealand includes Coastlands in the Whakatāne urban area.

Coastlands had a population of 1,776 at the 2018 New Zealand census, an increase of 276 people (18.4%) since the 2013 census, and an increase of 297 people (20.1%) since the 2006 census. There were 579 households, comprising 882 males and 894 females, giving a sex ratio of 0.99 males per female. The median age was 40.5 years (compared with 37.4 years nationally), with 426 people (24.0%) aged under 15 years, 273 (15.4%) aged 15 to 29, 855 (48.1%) aged 30 to 64, and 228 (12.8%) aged 65 or older.

Ethnicities were 68.2% European/Pākehā, 42.4% Māori, 3.7% Pacific peoples, 2.5% Asian, and 1.7% other ethnicities. People may identify with more than one ethnicity.

The percentage of people born overseas was 14.7, compared with 27.1% nationally.

Although some people chose not to answer the census's question about religious affiliation, 46.6% had no religion, 34.3% were Christian, 10.3% had Māori religious beliefs, 0.7% were Buddhist and 0.8% had other religions.

Of those at least 15 years old, 243 (18.0%) people had a bachelor's or higher degree, and 219 (16.2%) people had no formal qualifications. The median income was $34,400, compared with $31,800 nationally. 288 people (21.3%) earned over $70,000 compared to 17.2% nationally. The employment status of those at least 15 was that 732 (54.2%) people were employed full-time, 207 (15.3%) were part-time, and 60 (4.4%) were unemployed.

Education

References

Whakatane District
Populated places in the Bay of Plenty Region